Nicolò Pizzolo (circa 1420 – after 1453), also known as Nicolò di Pietro di Giovanni or with surname spelled Pizolo, was an Italian painter from Padua.

Biography
He initially worked with Ansuino da Forlì and Filippo Lippi to paint frescoes in the Chapel of the Podestà in Padua. He appears to have worked with Donatello.

He trained and worked under Francesco Squarcione alongside Andrea Mantegna. He painted an Assumption of Mary for the church of the Eremitani, Padua.

References
Tatjana Pauli, Mantegna, serie Art Book, Leonardo Arte, Milano 2001. 

1420s births
1468 deaths
Painters from Padua
15th-century Italian painters
Italian male painters